Zhu Guanghu (born September 25, 1949 in Shanghai, China) is a Chinese football coach and a former player. As a player, he was predominantly remembered for his time at Shanghai Football Team before going into management where he started off as a youth coach before becoming an assistant. He would get his chance at being a Head coach with Shenzhen Jianlibao where he won the 2004 Chinese Super League title. He would receive recognition for this accomplishment with the Chinese national football team position before leaving on 22 August 2007. Since then he has gone on to manage Wuhan Guanggu and Shaanxi Chanba.

Playing career
Zhu Guanghu would play as a midfielder for the top tier club Shanghai Football Team. He played for the national B team on some occasions, but was never a top national player.

Management career
He chose to coach after retiring as a player and became more known to the public when the Jianlibao youth team, a sponsored Chinese youth team to study and play in Brazil, returned to China in 1998. The team produced promising future stars such as Li Jinyu and Li Tie. Later, Zhu joined the China national football team and served as an assistant to the English head coach, Bobby Houghton. The team then later failed to qualify for the Olympic football tournament. Houghton was replaced by Bora Milutinovic and Zhu left to coach the Shenzhen Football Team.

On March 9, 2005, the Chinese Football Association named the Zhu Guanghu as the successor of the Dutch coach, Arie Haan. Earlier in 2004, Mr. Haan's contract expired as the result of his failure to lead the China national football team into qualification for the Football World Cup 2006. Zhu's appointment was due to his success in the Chinese Super League with Shenzhen Jianlibao Football Club by winning the league's first championship. Other factors also attributed to Zhu's appointment. As a native, Zhu was expected to accept a much lower wage package than a foreign coach and there would be no language barrier. A number of people, including FIFA president Sepp Blatter suggested that a native coach would have better communication with the players.

Zhu's short-term goal was to look for talented players and organize a new national football team. His ultimate goal was to lead the China national football team to qualify for the 2010 Football World Cup in South Africa.

In 2005, under Zhu's coach, the China national football team won the East Asian Cup, recording two draws (against South Korea and Japan) and one win (against North Korea). The title, though having not much significance, was the first official championship won by the China national football team.

Zhu has been criticized for his style of play, which tends to be over-defensive, according to some. Many fans of the national team have called for his resignation due to the team's decline in the FIFA World Rankings and several poor performances. On March 18, 2007, fans attacked his car while he was leaving a CSL match, which he had watched. They verbally insulted him, and the referee of that match who was with him was physically assaulted.

In 2007 AFC Asian Cup, just needing a draw in the last match, the Chinese side conceded three goals from free-kicks in the closing stage of the game against Uzbekistan. The first time not to qualify for the second round in 27 years, Zhu is strongly criticized for his tactics and submitted his resignation shortly after.

On 5 August, it was confirmed that after a three-month negotiation, Zhu was expected take the position of manager at Shenzhen Asia Travel again that weekend before the match against Guangzhou GPC. But on 31 August 2009, he signed a three-year-contract with Shaanxi Chanba, succeeding newly resigned Cheng Yaodong.

Honours

Manager

Shenzhen Jianlibao
Chinese Super League: 2004

Filmography
Zhu Guanghu has acted in at least 4 films since 1980.

See also
Sport in China
Football in China
China national under-23 football team
China women's national football team

References

External links
Chinese Football Association 
FIFA profile: China PR / Results / Fixtures
AFC profile: China PR
Sinosoc, comprehensive English-language news site on Chinese football

1949 births
Living people
Chinese footballers
Footballers from Shanghai
Bayi Football Team players
Shanghai Shenhua F.C. players
China national football team managers
Chinese football managers
2007 AFC Asian Cup managers
Beijing Renhe F.C. managers
Chinese Super League managers
Association football midfielders
20th-century Chinese male actors
21st-century Chinese male actors
Chinese male film actors
Male actors from Shanghai